Facundo David Nasif (born 10 September 1987) is an Argentine professional footballer who plays as a defender.

Career
Nasif began with Aldosivi, signing from Quilmes' youth. He made ten appearances in the 2008–09 Primera B Nacional, notably for his professional debut in a victory away to Talleres on 9 August 2008. His first goal arrived in September 2009 versus San Martín, which was one of seven across six seasons with the club. Nasif departed Aldosivi on 30 June 2014 to join San Jorge, with a move to Sportivo Belgrano coming seven months later. In July 2015, Nasif switched Argentina for Ecuador after agreeing terms with Técnico Universitario. He scored against L.D.U. Portoviejo and Delfín across twenty Serie B games.

2016 saw Nasif return to his homeland with Primera B Nacional's Los Andes. He was sent off during his second match versus All Boys on 10 April. In the succeeding August, Nasif joined Comunicaciones in Primera B Metropolitana. Three appearances followed, which preceded his departure on 10 January 2017 to Manta; returning to Ecuador's second tier. He netted against Olmedo during his time with the Manabí outfit. Nasif moved to Europe in August 2017, signing for Albanian Superliga side Luftëtari Gjirokastër. He appeared in just one league game, but did play twice and score once, vs. Elbasani, in the cup.

After spending eight months with Almirante Brown, Nasif went across Primera B Metropolitana to Colegiales on 12 July 2018. He was released in June 2020.

Career statistics
.

References

External links

1987 births
Living people
Sportspeople from Mar del Plata
Argentine footballers
Association football defenders
Argentine expatriate footballers
Expatriate footballers in Ecuador
Expatriate footballers in Albania
Argentine expatriate sportspeople in Ecuador
Argentine expatriate sportspeople in Albania
Primera Nacional players
Torneo Federal A players
Ecuadorian Serie B players
Primera B Metropolitana players
Kategoria Superiore players
Aldosivi footballers
San Jorge de Tucumán footballers
Sportivo Belgrano footballers
C.D. Técnico Universitario footballers
Club Atlético Los Andes footballers
Club Comunicaciones footballers
Manta F.C. footballers
Luftëtari Gjirokastër players
Club Almirante Brown footballers
Club Atlético Colegiales (Argentina) players